"One Little Kiss" is a country song written by Ashley Gorley, Jimmy Robbins, and Shane McAnally. It was originally recorded by American country singer Jake Owen for his 2013 studio album, Days of Gold, under the title "One Little Kiss (Never Killed Nobody)". The song was covered by Canadian country rock artist Dallas Smith three years later with the abbreviated title of "One Little Kiss". Both recordings were produced by Joey Moi. Smith's version was released April 22, 2016 through 604 Records as the second single off his third studio album, Side Effects (2016).

Reception

Critical
Corey Kelly of Canadian music blog Soundcheck Entertainment was complimentary of the song for both its "great production" and Smith's "kick ass voice." He also made note of its marketability to American country radio.

Commercial
"One Little Kiss" debuted at number 93 on the Billboard Canadian Hot 100 chart dated May 14, 2016. The song reached #1 on the iTunes Country singles chart and entered the Hot Canadian Digital Songs component chart at number 29 for the week of May 14, 2016. "One Little Kiss" entered the Canada Country airplay chart at number 30 and has since reached a peak position of 5. It was the most-played single on Canadian country radio by a Canadian artist in 2016 (and thirtieth overall).

Chart performance

Weekly charts

Year end charts

Certifications

References

Songs about kissing
2013 songs
2016 singles
604 Records singles
Dallas Smith songs
Jake Owen songs
Song recordings produced by Joey Moi
Songs written by Ashley Gorley
Songs written by Jimmy Robbins
Songs written by Shane McAnally
Music videos directed by Stephano Barberis